Gholam Hossein Tabrizi (born 1924 in Vayqan, died 1980 in Mashhad) was an Iranian Shia cleric. He is survived by his two sons, Mohammad-Mehdi Abdekhodaei and Mohammad-Hadi Abdekhodaei.

Early life and career 
Tabrizi was born Sheikh Gholam Hossein Tork in 1881 and grew up in a religious family in the city of Vayqan in Shabestar County. He later received his higher education in Mashhad, Tabriz. Other contemporary figures like Sheikh Mohammad Khiabani and Ahmad Kasravi were also studying at this time. Following his studies, Tabrizi began training at the Najaf Seminary to become a Shia cleric. For many years he led Friday evening prayers at the seminary, gave interpretations of the Quran at his house, and taught jurisprudence. He also helped Seyed Javad Khamenei with the establishment of another seminary.

Fada'iyan-e Islam 
The Mashhad branch of Fada'iyan-e Islam was headed by Tabrizi. He and other administrators and teachers led Quran interpretation sessions on Friday afternoons. The group also led provincial forums and sent letters and telegrams in support of Ruhollah Khomeini.

Death 
Tabrizi was assassinated in 1980 at the age of 97. He is buried at the Imam Reza shrine, along with Seyyed Abdulkarim Hasheminejad.

Professors 
 Mohammad-Kazem Khorasani
 Mohammed Kazem Yazdi
 Mohammad Hossein Qa'ravi Esfahani 
 Fethullah Qa'ravi Isfahani
 Mirza Abolhassan Angaji

References 

People from Tabriz
Iranian Shia clerics
1881 births
1980 deaths
Pupils of Muhammad Kadhim Khorasani
Burials at Imam Reza Shrine